Dummy Lake is a lake in Kenora District, Ontario, Canada.

See also
List of lakes in Ontario

References

Lakes of Kenora District